Kim Dong-hee (born 6 May 1989) is a South Korean footballer who plays for Pyeongtaek Citizen FC as a striker.

On 23 December 2016, Seongnam FC announced that Kim is going to stay another season for Seongnam.

References

External links 

13 Kim Dong-hee at seongnamfc.com 

1989 births
Living people
Association football forwards
South Korean footballers
South Korean expatriate footballers
Pohang Steelers players
Daejeon Hana Citizen FC players
Giravanz Kitakyushu players
Seongnam FC players
K League 1 players
K League 2 players
J2 League players
Expatriate footballers in Japan
South Korean expatriate sportspeople in Japan
Yonsei University alumni